Bartkowa  is a village in the administrative district of Gmina Gródek nad Dunajcem, within Nowy Sącz County, Lesser Poland Voivodeship, in southern Poland.

The village has a population of 1,143.

References

Bartkowa